The 53rd annual Venice International Film Festival was held between 28 August to 7 September 1996.

Jury
The following people comprised the 1996 jury:
 Roman Polanski (head of jury)
 Paul Auster 
 Souleymane Cissé 
 Mrinal Sen 
 Callisto Cosulich 
 Anjelica Huston 
 Miriam Mafai 
 Antonio Skármeta 
 Hulya Ucansu

Official selection

In competition

Out of competition

Sleppers by Barry Levinson (Usa) - Opening film  
Third Millenium Stories by Francesco Maselli (Italy)  
Shine by Scott Hicks (Australia)
The Portrait of a Lady by Jane Campion (UK)

Venetian Nights 
Bound by The Wachowskis (Usa) 
The Fan by Tony Scott (Usa) 
Independence Day  by Roland Emmerich (Usa) 
Bambola  by Bigas Luna (Spain-Italy-France)
Last Man Standing  by Walter Hill (Usa) 
Multiplicity  by Harold Ramis (Usa) 
Szamanka  by Andrzej Zulawski (Poland) 
The Frighteners  by Peter Jackson 	(Australia) 
True Blue  by Ferdinand Fairfax (UK)

Window on Images
Zone Franche by Paul Vecchiali (France) 
The Age of Possibilities  by Pascale Ferran (France) 
Chronicle of a Disappearance  by Elia Suleiman (Israel-Usa-Germany-France) 
Méfie-toi de l'eau qui dort  by Jacques Deschamps (France) 
Hard Core Logo  by Bruce McDonald (Canada)  
Metamorphosis of a Melody  by Amos Gitai (Israel) 
De nieuwe moeder  by Paula van der Oest (Netherlands)
Escoriandoli  by	Flavia Mastrella, Antonio Rezza (Italy)   
Guy   by	Michael Lindsay-Hogg (Usa) 
Polygraph  by	Robert Lepage (Canada) 
Love and Other Catastrophes  by	Emma-Kate Croghan 	(Australia)
A True Story  by Abolfazl Jalili (Iran)

Documentaries
The Games of Love  by	Frederick Wiseman  (France) 
Sei minuti all'alba  by Daniele Segre (Italy)   
And the Show Goes On  by Mrinal Sen (UK-France-India)  
Yang Yin Genger in Chinese Cinema   by Stanley Kwan (Hong Kong)  
Bophana: A Cambodian Tragedy   by Rithy Panh (France-Cambogia)  
Die Frucht deines Leibes  by Barbara Albert (Austria)
A Trick of Light  by Wim Wenders (Germany)
Le convoi by Patrice Chagnard  (France) 
La vita a volo D'Angelo by Roberta Torre (Italy)   
Marco Melani, ladro e frate di cinema by Enrico Ghezzi, Carmelo Marabello (Italy)

Overtaking Lane
Swingers by Doug Liman (Usa) 
Kolya by Jan Svěrák (Czech Republic)
The Dress by Alex van Warmerdam (Netherlands)
Intimate Relations by 	Philip Goodhew  (Canada)
Fistful of Flies by	Monica Pellizzari (Australia)   
Lea  by Ivan Fíla (Czech Republic)
Livers Ain't Cheap by James Merendino (Usa) 
Swallowtail Butterfly by Shunji Iwai (Japan) 
Ni d'Ève, ni d'Adam by Jean-Paul Civeyrac (France)

Italian Cinema Week 
Isotta by Maurizio Fiume (Italy)   
Albergo Roma by Ugo Chiti (Italy)   
We Free Kings by Sergio Citti (Italy)   
Acquario by Michele Sordillo (Italy)   
The Border by 	Franco Giraldi (Italy)  
My Generation by  Wilma Labate (Italy)  
Voci nel tempo by  Franco Piavoli (Italy)

Special screenings 
Fantoosh by Morag McKinnon (UK)
Nitrato d'argento by Marco Ferreri (Italy)   
Go Now by Michael Winterbottom (UK) 
Festival  by Pupi Avati (Italy)   
Grace of My Heart by Allison Anders (Usa) 
Pole Pole by Massimo Martelli (Italy) 
How the Toys Saved Christmas by Enzo D'Alò (Italy-Switzerland-Germany-Luxembourg)  
Forgotten Silver by Peter Jackson	(Australia) 
The Gates of Heaven by Vittorio De Sica (Italy)  
Small Wonders by Allan Miller (Usa) 
Loach in Nicaragua by Marlisa Trombetta (Italy) 
Long Fliv the King by Leo McCarey (Usa) 
Flaming Fathers by Leo McCarey (Usa)

Awards
 Golden Lion:
Michael Collins by Neil Jordan
Grand Special Jury Prize:
Brigands, chapitre VII by Otar Iosseliani
Golden Osella:
Best Original Screenplay - Profundo carmesí by Paz Alicia Garciadiego
Best Original Music - David Mansfield for Profundo carmesí
Best Set Design - Profundo carmesí by Paz Alicia Garciadiego
Volpi Cup:
Best Actor - Liam Neeson for Michael Collins
Best Actress - Victoire Thivisol for Ponette
Best Supporting Performer - Chris Penn for The Funeral
Honorable Mention:
Jan Sverák for Kolya
The President of the Italian Senate's Gold Medal:
Ken Loach for Carla's Song
Luigi De Laurentiis Award:
Chronicle of a Disappearance by Elia Suleiman
Career Golden Lion:
Robert Altman
Michèle Morgan
Vittorio Gassman
Dustin Hoffman
FIPRESCI Prize:
Alex van Warmerdam for De jurk
Pascale Ferran for L'âge des possibles
Jacques Doillon for Ponette
OCIC Award:
Jacques Doillon for Ponette
Abel Ferrara for The Funeral
OCIC Special Award:
La porta del cielo
OCIC Award - Honorable Mention:
Ivan Fila for Lea
UNICEF Award:
Volker Schlöndorff for Der Unhold
CICT-IFTC Award:
Small Wonders by Allan Miller
Pasinetti Award:
Best Film - The Portrait of a Lady by Jane Campion
Best Actor - Fabrizio Bentivoglio for Pianese Nunzio, 14 anni a maggio
Best Actress - Tereza Zajickova for Vesna va veloce
Pietro Bianchi Award:
Roberto Perpignani
Carlo Lizzani
FEDIC Award:
Voci nel tempo by Franco Piavoli
Little Golden Lion:
Claude Lelouch for Hommes, femmes, mode d'emploi
Elvira Notari Prize:
Monica Pellizzari for Fistful of Flies
Sergio Trasatti Award:
Jacques Doillon for Ponette
'CinemAvvenire' Award:
Best Film on the Relationship Man-Nature - Jacques Deschamps for Still Waters Run Deep
Best First Work - Jacques Deschamps for Still Waters Run Deep
Kodak Award:
Ugo Chiti for Albergo Roma
AIACA Award:
Stefano Gigli for Il fratello minore

References

External links 

Venice Film Festival 1996 Awards on IMDb

Venice
V
Venice Film Festival
Film
Venice
August 1996 events in Europe
September 1996 events in Europe